"Washington Square" is a popular instrumental from 1963 by the New York City-based jazz group The Village Stompers.  The composition was written by Bobb Goldsteinn and David Shire.

Background
The composition is named after the famous park in New York City.

Chart performance
"Washington Square" was a hit single, reaching No. 2 on the Billboard Hot 100 chart in the week ending 23 November 1963, kept from the summit of the Billboard Hot 100 by Dale and Grace's hit song "I'm Leaving It Up to You". "Washington Square" did, however, top the Billboard Easy Listening chart for three weeks that November and made the top 30 on the Billboard R&B chart.

Accolades
In addition, the instrumental was nominated for a Grammy Award in the category Best Instrumental Theme.

Other recordings
Other artists have recorded the tune, sometimes with song lyrics.  Among these acts are: 
The Ames Brothers 1963 (without Ed Ames; their last national chart record)
The Kirby Stone Four 1963
Lawrence Welk 1963
Kenny Ball 1963
Spike Jones 1963
Kai Winding 1963
Sammy Kaye & His Orchestra 1964
Andre Kostelanetz 1964
Billy Vaughn 1964
The Dukes of Dixieland 1968
James Last 1970
Percy Faith 1974
The Ventures 1980
Nightmares on Wax 1999
Chinese Man 2006. 
In Asia, a South Korean female vocalist band Lee Sisters released a recording of this tune. 
Hong Kong Cantopop artist Samuel Hui also released a recording of the tune in Cantonese, titled 學生哥 (Xue Sheng Ge) for the film The Contract, with lyrics regarding students.

Popular culture
The tune was also featured as a very important plot piece in the 2020 Stephen King HBO drama The Outsider.

See also
List of number-one adult contemporary singles of 1963 (U.S.)

References

1963 singles
The Village Stompers songs
1960s instrumentals
Songs written by David Shire
1963 songs